Karakunnu is a village in Thrikkalangode Panchayath Malappuram district in the state of Kerala, India.

Demographics
At the 2001 India census, Karakunnu had a population of 13,992 with 6,890 males and 7,102 females.

Notable people
 Muhammad (Karakunnu), writer, born 1950 in Karakunnu

References

Villages in Malappuram district
Nilambur area